Tranmere Rovers F.C. played the 1933–34 season in the Football League Third Division North. It was their 13th season of league football, and they finished 7th of 22. They reached the Fourth Round of the FA Cup.

Football League

References 

Tranmere Rovers F.C. seasons